The heads and corporate officers of the Canadian Pacific Railway.

Presidents

List of CPR presidents since 1881:

 1881-1888 Sir George Stephen, 1st Baron Mount Stephen Bt. GCVO  
 1889-1899 Sir William Cornelius Van Horne KCMG 
 1899-1918 Sir Thomas George Shaughnessy, 1st Baron Shaughnessy KCVO 
 1918-1942 Sir Edward Wentworth Beatty GBE 
 1942-1947 D'Alton Corry Coleman CMG 
 1947-1948 William Mertin Neal
 1948-1955 William Allan Mather KGStJ
 1955-1964, 1966 Norris Roy "Buck" Crump CC  
 1964-1966 Robert A. "Bob" Emerson 
 1966-1972 Ian David Sinclair OC a.k.a. Big Julie 
 1972-1981 Frederick Stewart "Fred" Burbidge OC 
 1981-1996 William W. "Bill" Stinson
 1996-2001 David P. O'Brien OC
 2001-2006 Robert J. "Rob" Ritchie 
 2006-2012 Frederic J. "Fred" Green
 2012-2017 E. Hunter Harrison 
 2017–Present Keith Creel

Chief Executive Officer of CPR

Before 2012 the CEO was a separate title and thereafter held by the President of the company.

 E. Hunter Harrison 2012-2017
 Frederic J. "Fred" Green 2006-2012
 Robert J. Ritchie 1995-2006
 Ian Barry Scott</ref> 1985-1995</ref>

Notes

nl:Canadian Pacific Railroad